Chao Inthavong (died 7 February 1805), or known as his regnal name Xaiya Setthathirath III, was the 5th king of the Kingdom of Vientiane (r. 1795 to 1805). 

Inthavong was the second son of King Ong Boun. In 1778, he was taken as hostage by Siamese together with his siblings, including Nanthasen, Anouvong and Khamwaen. 

After Nanthasen crowned the Vientiane king, he was appointed the oupahat ("vice king") of Vientiane. However, he had to live in Bang Phlat (Khwaeng Bang Yi Khan), Bangkok, where he entered the Siamese government service. After the Battle of Rạch Gầm-Xoài Mút, Vietnamese ruler Nguyễn Ánh fled to Bangkok. There, Inthavong met Nguyễn Ánh. According to Vietnamese royal records, Inthavong "admired him".

In 1791, the Tây Sơn invaded and occupied Vientiane. King Nanthasen had to temporarily flee to Siam. In 1795, King Nanthasen was deposed by Siamese, Inthavong crowned the new king. During Inthavong's reign, Vientiane made alliance with Nguyễn lord. In 1800 and 1801, when Nguyễn army marched north to attack Tây Sơn dynasty, Inthavong ordered his forces to attack Nghệ An Province, cooperating with Nguyễn forces. 

Inthavong died on 7 February 1805. His younger brother Anouvong was appointed the new king by Siamese, and sent back to Vientiane.

References

Kings of Vientiane
1805 deaths
19th century in Vientiane
19th-century monarchs in Asia
18th-century Laotian people
19th-century Laotian people